Hillview MRT station is an underground Mass Rapid Transit (MRT) station on the Downtown Line, situated on the boundaries of Hillview and Nature Reserve planning subzones, Singapore.

The station serves the Upper Bukit Timah corridor, at the junction between Upper Bukit Timah Road, Dairy Farm Road and Hillview Road. The vicinity is largely residential, with commercial buildings such as the Rail Mall and HillV2 within walking distance.

The section of tracks between Hillview station and Beauty World MRT station is the longest between any two MRT stations on the Downtown Line till 2025. There are basic structural provisions for a future station (also known as a "box station") along this section of tracks near Hume Avenue. Hume MRT station was confirmed on 7 March 2019 and is to be operational by 2025.

Art in Transit
"What Remains" by Darren Soh is an artwork that documents the remnants of the KTM railway line.

References

Railway stations in Singapore opened in 2015
Bukit Panjang
Mass Rapid Transit (Singapore) stations